The Courage and Civility Award is an annual award distributed by Jeff Bezos since 2021.

The award is accompanied by $100 million for the receiver of the award, to distribute to other non-profit organizations.  Each award comes with a ten-year window in which the funds have to be distributed.

Winners

References

External links

 Bezos, Jeff (2021-07-20). , First Human Flight Post-Flight Press Conference

Awards established in 2021